The 1961 British Grand Prix was a Formula One motor race, held on 15 July 1961 at the Aintree Circuit, near Liverpool. It was race 5 of 8 in both the 1961 World Championship of Drivers and the 1961 International Cup for Formula One Manufacturers.

Following a wet weekend, with torrential rain affecting both qualifying and the race start, the Grand Prix was ultimately dominated by Scuderia Ferrari, with their drivers taking all three podium positions. The race was won by German Wolfgang von Trips, who had led for much of the race after starting from fourth place on the grid. This was von Trips's second but also his final Grand Prix victory as two races later he was killed in an accident during the 1961 Italian Grand Prix. Pole position winner Phil Hill drove to second place, on his way to winning the World Drivers' Championship at the end of the season, and third place was taken by Hill's American compatriot Richie Ginther.

The 1961 British Grand Prix is also notable as being the first occasion on which a four-wheel drive car, and the last at which a front engined car was entered for a World Championship race. These two accomplishments were achieved by the same vehicle: the experimental Ferguson P99-Climax run by the Rob Walker Racing Team. Although the car was disqualified for receiving assistance on the track, in the hands of Stirling Moss – who took over the car from first driver Jack Fairman after his own Lotus's brakes failed – it showed some promise. The 1961 British Grand Prix also marked the last occasion on which Moss contested a Grand Prix race on home soil, as his career was ended by an accident during a non-championship race prior to the 1962 season.

Classification

Qualifying

Race

Championship standings after the race

Drivers' Championship standings

Constructors' Championship standings

 Notes: Only the top five positions are included for both sets of standings.

References

British Grand Prix
British Grand Prix
Grand Prix